Pacer International, also known as Pacer Stacktrain stylized as PACER STACKTRAIN, is the former name of a major North American provider of intermodal services, now owned by XPO Logistics (NYSE: XPO). The business is an asset-light transportation logistics provider, which markets its services under the brand XPO Logistics. In Mexico, services are provided under the brand Pacer, An XPO Logistics Company.

With the acquisition of Pacer International on March 31, 2014, XPO Logistics became the third largest provider of intermodal services in North America and the largest provider of cross-border Mexico intermodal.

The former Pacer operations have been integrated into the XPO Logistics service offering, which includes truck brokerage, intermodal, ground and air expedite, last mile logistics, contract logistics, freight forwarding, less-than-truckload brokerage and managed transportation.

Company history

 1984: Don Orris leads the development of the first cost-effective double-stack rail network service, an innovation that led to a major change in the movement of domestic goods within the United States, Mexico, and Canada. Orris would go on to found Pacer International.
 1997: Don Orris, Chairman and CEO, founds Pacer International when he begins acquiring the 14 small-to-medium-sized companies in transportation, third party logistics, intermodal marketing, drayage, and ocean transportation.
 1999: Pacer acquires APL Stacktrain and operates the new business unit as Pacer Stacktrain.
 2001: Pacer consolidates its transportation and logistics brokerage services in its subsidiary Pacer Global Logistics. This unit was renamed Pacer Transportation Solutions in 2008.
 2002: Ajay Amlani is hired to lead strategic initiatives at the company and lead its IPO process.
 2002: Pacer becomes a public company (NASDAQ: PACR).
 2006: Michael E. Uremovich is appointed Chairman and CEO.
 2008:
 Pacer’s intermodal network doubles in size with the addition of BNSF service routes.
 Pacer begins expansion of its truck brokerage and highway services units.
 2009: Daniel W. Avramovich is appointed Chairman and CEO.
 2014: On March 31, XPO Logistics completed the acquisition of Pacer International. Paul Smith was subsequently appointed as President–Intermodal Operations.

Operating structure
The former Pacer intermodal operations are part of the XPO Logistics freight brokerage business segment.

Awards and recognition

References

External links

 

Companies based in Contra Costa County, California
Companies formerly listed on the Nasdaq
Transportation companies of the United States
Transportation companies based in California
Transportation companies based in Ohio